Pablo Neruda(born Ricardo Eliécer Neftalí Reyes Basoalto; 12 July 1904 – 23 September 1973), was a Chilean poet-diplomat and politician who won the 1971 Nobel Prize in Literature. Neruda became known as a poet when he was 13 years old, and wrote in a variety of styles, including surrealist poems, historical epics, overtly left-wing political manifestos in which he advocated for violent opposition against the United States and other countries adherent to the ideas and principles of democratic capitalism, a prose autobiography, and passionate love poems such as the ones in his collection Twenty Love Poems and a Song of Despair (1924).

Neruda occupied many diplomatic positions in various countries during his lifetime and served a term as a Senator for the Chilean Communist Party. When President Gabriel González Videla outlawed communism in Chile in 1948, a warrant was issued for Neruda's arrest. Friends hid him for months in the basement of a house in the port city of Valparaíso, and in 1949 he escaped through a mountain pass near Maihue Lake into Argentina; he would not return to Chile for more than three years. He was a close advisor to Chile's socialist President Salvador Allende, and, when he got back to Chile after accepting his Nobel Prize in Stockholm, Allende invited him to read at the Estadio Nacional before 70,000 people.

Neruda was hospitalized with cancer in September 1973, at the time of the coup d'état led by Augusto Pinochet and the United States that overthrew Allende's government, but returned home after a few days when he suspected a doctor of injecting him with an unknown substance for the purpose of murdering him on Pinochet's orders. 

Neruda died at his home in Isla Negra on 23 September 1973, just hours after leaving the hospital. Although it was long reported that he died of heart failure, the Interior Ministry of the Chilean government issued a statement in 2015 acknowledging a Ministry document indicating the government's official position that "it was clearly possible and highly likely" that Neruda was killed as a result of "the intervention of third parties". However, an international forensic test conducted in 2013 rejected allegations that he was poisoned. It was concluded that he had been suffering from prostate cancer. In 2023, after forensics testing, it was discovered that the bacteria Clostridium botulinum, some strains of which produce toxins, were found in his body. The bacteria were likely injected by medical personnel while Neruda was in a hospital, as he had told his chauffeur Manuel Araya on a phone call shortly before his death.

Neruda is often considered the national poet of Chile, and his works have been popular and influential worldwide. The Colombian novelist Gabriel García Márquez once called him "the greatest poet of the 20th century in any language", and the critic Harold Bloom included Neruda as one of the writers central to the Western tradition in his book The Western Canon.

Early life

Ricardo Eliécer Neftalí Reyes Basoalto was born on 12 July 1904, in Parral, Chile, a city in Linares Province, now part of the greater Maule Region, some 350 km south of Santiago. His father, José del Carmen Reyes Morales, was a railway employee, and his mother Rosa Neftalí Basoalto Opazo was a school teacher who died two months after he was born on 14 September. On 26 September, he was baptized in the parish of San Jose de Parral. Neruda grew up in Temuco with Rodolfo and a half-sister, Laura Herminia "Laurita", from one of his father's extramarital affairs (her mother was Aurelia Tolrà, a Catalan woman). He composed his first poems in the winter of 1914. Neruda was an atheist.

Literary career

Neruda's father opposed his son's interest in writing and literature, but he received encouragement from others, including the future Nobel Prize winner Gabriela Mistral, who headed the local school. On 18 July 1917, at the age of 13, he published his first work, an essay titled "Entusiasmo y perseverancia" ("Enthusiasm and Perseverance") in the local daily newspaper La Mañana, and signed it Neftalí Reyes. From 1918 to mid-1920, he published numerous poems, such as "Mis ojos" ("My eyes"), and essays in local magazines as Neftalí Reyes. In 1919, he participated in the literary contest Juegos Florales del Maule and won third place for his poem "Comunión ideal" or "Nocturno ideal". By mid-1920, when he adopted the pseudonym Pablo Neruda, he was a published author of poems, prose, and journalism. He is thought to have derived his pen name from the Czech poet Jan Neruda, though other sources say the true inspiration was Moravian violinist Wilma Neruda, whose name appears in Arthur Conan Doyle's novel A Study in Scarlet.

In 1921, at the age of 16, Neruda moved to Santiago to study French at the Universidad de Chile with the intention of becoming a teacher. However, he was soon devoting all his time to writing poems and with the help of well-known writer Eduardo Barrios, he managed to meet and impress Don Carlos George Nascimento, the most important publisher in Chile at the time. In 1923, his first volume of verse, Crepusculario (Book of Twilights), was published by Editorial Nascimento, followed the next year by Veinte poemas de amor y una canción desesperada (Twenty Love Poems and A Desperate Song), a collection of love poems that was controversial for its eroticism, especially considering its author's young age. Both works were critically acclaimed and have been translated into many languages. A second edition of Veinte poemas appeared in 1932. In the years since its publication, millions of copies have been sold and it became Neruda's best-known work. Almost 100 years later, Veinte Poemas is still the best-selling poetry book in the Spanish language. By the age of 20, Neruda had established an international reputation as a poet but faced poverty.

In 1926, he published the collection tentativa del hombre infinito (venture of the infinite man) and the novel El habitante y su esperanza (The Inhabitant and His Hope). In 1927, out of financial desperation, he took an honorary consulship in Rangoon, the capital of the British colony of Burma, then administered from New Delhi as a province of British India. Later, mired in isolation and loneliness, he worked in Colombo (Ceylon), Batavia (Java), and Singapore. In Batavia the following year, he met and married (6 December 1930) his first wife, a Dutch bank employee named Marijke Antonieta Hagenaar Vogelzang (born as Marietje Antonia Hagenaar), known as Maruca. While he was in the diplomatic service, Neruda read large amounts of verse, experimented with many different poetic forms, and wrote the first two volumes of Residencia en la Tierra, which includes many surrealist poems.

Diplomatic and political career

Spanish Civil War

After returning to Chile, Neruda was given diplomatic posts in Buenos Aires and then Barcelona, Spain. He later succeeded Gabriela Mistral as consul in Madrid, where he became the center of a lively literary circle, befriending such writers as Rafael Alberti, Federico García Lorca, and the Peruvian poet César Vallejo. His only offspring, his daughter Malva Marina (Trinidad) Reyes, was born in Madrid in 1934, the product of his first marriage to María Antonia Hagenaar. The child was plagued with severe health problems, in particular suffering from hydrocephalus. She died in 1943 (nine years old), having spent most of her short life with a foster family in the Netherlands after Neruda ignored and abandoned her, forcing her mother to work to solely support her care. Half that time was during the Nazi occupation of Holland, when the Nazi mentality on birth defects denoted genetic inferiority at best.

As Spain became engulfed in civil war, Neruda became intensely politicized for the first time. His experiences during the Spanish Civil War and its aftermath moved him away from privately focused work in the direction of collective obligation. Neruda became an ardent Communist for the rest of his life. The radical leftist politics of his literary friends, as well as that of del Carril, were contributing factors, but the most important catalyst was the execution of García Lorca by forces loyal to the dictator Francisco Franco. By means of his speeches and writings, Neruda threw his support behind the Spanish Republic, publishing the collection España en el corazón (Spain in Our Hearts, 1938). He lost his post as consul due to his political militancy. In July 1937, he attended the Second International Writers' Congress, the purpose of which was to discuss the attitude of intellectuals to the war in Spain, held in Valencia, Barcelona and Madrid and attended by many writers including André Malraux, Ernest Hemingway and Stephen Spender.

Neruda's marriage to Vogelzang broke down and he eventually obtained a divorce in Mexico in 1943. His estranged wife moved to Monte Carlo to escape the hostilities in Spain and then to the Netherlands with their very ill only child, and he never saw either of them again. After leaving his wife, Neruda lived with Delia del Carril in France, eventually marrying her (shortly after his divorce) in Tetecala in 1943; however, his new marriage was not recognized by Chilean authorities as his divorce from Vogelzang was deemed illegal.

Following the election of Pedro Aguirre Cerda (whom Neruda supported) as President of Chile in 1938, Neruda was appointed special Consul for Spanish emigrants in Paris. There he was responsible for what he called "the noblest mission I have ever undertaken": transporting 2,000 Spanish refugees who had been housed by the French in squalid camps to Chile on an old ship called the Winnipeg. Neruda is sometimes charged with having selected only fellow Communists for emigration, to the exclusion of others who had fought on the side of the Republic. Many Republicans and Anarchists were killed during the German invasion and occupation. Others deny these accusations, pointing out that Neruda chose only a few hundred of the 2,000 refugees personally; the rest were selected by the Service for the Evacuation of Spanish Refugees set up by Juan Negrín, President of the Spanish Republican Government in Exile.

Mexican appointment

Neruda's next diplomatic post was as Consul General in Mexico City from 1940 to 1943. While he was there, he married del Carril, and learned that his daughter Malva had died, aged eight, in the Nazi-occupied Netherlands.

In 1940, after the failure of an assassination attempt against Leon Trotsky, Neruda arranged a Chilean visa for the Mexican painter David Alfaro Siqueiros, who was accused of having been one of the conspirators in the assassination. Neruda later said that he did it at the request of the Mexican President, Manuel Ávila Camacho. This enabled Siqueiros, then jailed, to leave Mexico for Chile, where he stayed in Neruda's private residence. In exchange for Neruda's assistance, Siqueiros spent over a year painting a mural in a school in Chillán. Neruda's relationship with Siqueiros attracted criticism, but Neruda dismissed the allegation that his intent had been to help an assassin as "sensationalist politico-literary harassment".

Return to Chile

In 1943, after his return to Chile, Neruda made a tour of Peru, where he visited Machu Picchu, an experience that later inspired Alturas de Macchu Picchu, a book-length poem in 12 parts that he completed in 1945 and which expressed his growing awareness of, and interest in, the ancient civilizations of the Americas. He explored this theme further in Canto General (1950). In Alturas, Neruda celebrated the achievement of Machu Picchu, but also condemned the slavery that had made it possible. In Canto XII, he called upon the dead of many centuries to be born again and to speak through him. Martín Espada, poet and professor of creative writing at the University of Massachusetts Amherst, has hailed the work as a masterpiece, declaring that "there is no greater political poem".

Communism

Bolstered by his experiences in the Spanish Civil War, Neruda, like many left-leaning intellectuals of his generation, came to admire the Soviet Union of Joseph Stalin, partly for the role it played in defeating Nazi Germany and partly because of an idealist interpretation of Marxist doctrine. This is echoed in poems such as "Canto a Stalingrado" (1942) and "Nuevo canto de amor a Stalingrado" (1943). In 1953, Neruda was awarded the Stalin Peace Prize. Upon Stalin's death that same year, Neruda wrote an ode to him, as he also wrote poems in praise of Fulgencio Batista, "Saludo a Batista" ("Salute to Batista"), and later to Fidel Castro. His fervent Stalinism eventually drove a wedge between Neruda and his long-time friend, Mexican poet Octavio Paz, who commented that "Neruda became more and more Stalinist, while I became less and less enchanted with Stalin." Their differences came to a head after the Nazi-Soviet Ribbentrop–Molotov Pact of 1939, when they almost came to blows in an argument over Stalin. Although Paz still considered Neruda "The greatest poet of his generation", in an essay on Aleksandr Solzhenitsyn he wrote that when he thinks of "Neruda and other famous Stalinist writers and poets, I feel the gooseflesh that I get from reading certain passages of the Inferno. No doubt they began in good faith [...] but insensibly, commitment by commitment, they saw themselves becoming entangled in a mesh of lies, falsehoods, deceits and perjuries, until they lost their souls." On 15 July 1945, at Pacaembu Stadium in São Paulo, Brazil, Neruda read to 100,000 people in honor of the Communist revolutionary leader Luís Carlos Prestes.

Neruda also called Vladimir Lenin the "great genius of this century", and in a speech he gave on 5 June 1946, he paid tribute to the late Soviet leader Mikhail Kalinin, who for Neruda was "man of noble life", "the great constructor of the future", and "a comrade in arms of Lenin and Stalin".

Neruda later came to regret his fondness for the Soviet Union, explaining that "in those days, Stalin seemed to us the conqueror who had crushed Hitler's armies." Of a subsequent visit to China in 1957, Neruda wrote: "What has estranged me from the Chinese revolutionary process has not been Mao Tse-tung but Mao Tse-tungism." He dubbed this Mao Tse-Stalinism: "the repetition of a cult of a Socialist deity." Despite his disillusionment with Stalin, Neruda never lost his essential faith in Communist theory and remained loyal to "the Party". Anxious not to give ammunition to his ideological enemies, he would later refuse publicly to condemn the Soviet repression of dissident writers like Boris Pasternak and Joseph Brodsky, an attitude with which even some of his staunchest admirers disagreed.

On 4 March 1945, Neruda was elected a Communist Senator for the northern provinces of Antofagasta and Tarapacá in the Atacama Desert. He officially joined the Communist Party of Chile four months later. In 1946, the Radical Party's presidential candidate, Gabriel González Videla, asked Neruda to act as his campaign manager. González Videla was supported by a coalition of left-wing parties and Neruda fervently campaigned on his behalf. Once in office, however, González Videla turned against the Communist Party and issued the Ley de Defensa Permanente de la Democracia (Law of Permanent Defense of the Democracy). The breaking point for Senator Neruda was the violent repression of a Communist-led miners' strike in Lota in October 1947, when striking workers were herded into island military prisons and a concentration camp in the town of Pisagua. Neruda's criticism of González Videla culminated in a dramatic speech in the Chilean senate on 6 January 1948, which became known as "Yo acuso" ("I accuse"), in the course of which he read out the names of the miners and their families who were imprisoned at the concentration camp.

In 1959, Neruda was present as Fidel Castro was honored at a welcoming ceremony offered by the Central University of Venezuela where he spoke to a massive gathering of students and read his Canto a Bolivar. Luis Báez summarized what Neruda said: "In this painful and victorious hour that the peoples of America live, my poem with changes of place, can be understood directed to Fidel Castro, because in the struggles for freedom the fate of a Man to give confidence to the spirit of greatness in the history of our peoples".

During the late 1960s, Argentine writer Jorge Luis Borges was asked for his opinion of Pablo Neruda. Borges stated, "I think of him as a very fine poet, a very fine poet. I don't admire him as a man, I think of him as a very mean man." He said that Neruda had not spoken out against Argentine President Juan Perón because he was afraid to risk his reputation, noting "I was an Argentine poet, he was a Chilean poet, he's on the side of the Communists; I'm against them. So I felt he was behaving very wisely in avoiding a meeting that would have been quite uncomfortable for both of us."

Hiding and exile, 1948–1952

A few weeks after his "Yo acuso" speech in 1948, finding himself threatened with arrest, Neruda went into hiding and he and his wife were smuggled from house to house hidden by supporters and admirers for the next 13 months. While in hiding, Senator Neruda was removed from office and, in September 1948, the Communist Party was banned altogether under the Ley de Defensa Permanente de la Democracia, called by critics the Ley Maldita (Accursed Law), which eliminated over 26,000 people from the electoral registers, thus stripping them of their right to vote. Neruda later moved to Valdivia in southern Chile. From Valdivia he moved to Fundo Huishue, a forestry estate in the vicinity of Huishue Lake. Neruda's life underground ended in March 1949 when he fled over the Lilpela Pass in the Andes Mountains to Argentina on horseback. He would dramatically recount his escape from Chile in his Nobel Prize lecture.

Once out of Chile, he spent the next three years in exile. In Buenos Aires, Neruda took advantage of the slight resemblance between him and his friend, the future Nobel Prize-winning novelist and cultural attaché to the Guatemalan embassy Miguel Ángel Asturias, to travel to Europe using Asturias' passport. Pablo Picasso arranged his entrance into Paris and Neruda made a surprise appearance there to a stunned World Congress of Peace Forces, while the Chilean government denied that the poet could have escaped the country. Neruda spent those three years traveling extensively throughout Europe as well as taking trips to India, China, Sri Lanka, and the Soviet Union. His trip to Mexico in late 1949 was lengthened due to a serious bout of phlebitis. A Chilean singer named Matilde Urrutia was hired to care for him and they began an affair that would, years later, culminate in marriage. During his exile, Urrutia would travel from country to country shadowing him and they would arrange meetings whenever they could. Matilde Urrutia was the muse for Los versos del capitán, a book of poetry which Neruda later published anonymously in 1952.

While in Mexico, Neruda also published his lengthy epic poem Canto General, a Whitmanesque catalog of the history, geography, and flora and fauna of South America, accompanied by Neruda's observations and experiences. Many of them dealt with his time underground in Chile, which is when he composed much of the poem. In fact, he had carried the manuscript with him during his escape on horseback. A month later, a different edition of 5,000 copies was boldly published in Chile by the outlawed Communist Party based on a manuscript Neruda had left behind. In Mexico, he was granted honorary Mexican citizenship. Neruda's 1952 stay in a villa owned by Italian historian Edwin Cerio on the island of Capri was fictionalized in Antonio Skarmeta's 1985 novel Ardiente Paciencia (Ardent Patience, later known as El cartero de Neruda, or Neruda's Postman), which inspired the popular film Il Postino (1994).

Second return to Chile

By 1952, the González Videla government was on its last legs, weakened by corruption scandals. The Chilean Socialist Party was in the process of nominating Salvador Allende as its candidate for the September 1952 presidential elections and was keen to have the presence of Neruda, by now Chile's most prominent left-wing literary figure, to support the campaign. Neruda returned to Chile in August of that year and rejoined Delia del Carril, who had traveled ahead of him some months earlier, but the marriage was crumbling. Del Carril eventually learned of his affair with Matilde Urrutia and he sent her back to Chile in 1955. She convinced the Chilean officials to lift his arrest, allowing Urrutia and Neruda to go to Capri, Italy. Now united with Urrutia, Neruda would, aside from many foreign trips and a stint as Allende's ambassador to France from 1970 to 1973, spend the rest of his life in Chile.

By this time, Neruda enjoyed worldwide fame as a poet, and his books were being translated into virtually all the major languages of the world. He vigorously denounced the United States during the Cuban Missile Crisis and later in the decade he likewise repeatedly condemned the U.S. for its involvement in the Vietnam War. But being one of the most prestigious and outspoken left-wing intellectuals alive, he also attracted opposition from ideological opponents. The Congress for Cultural Freedom, an anti-communist organization covertly established and funded by the U.S. Central Intelligence Agency, adopted Neruda as one of its primary targets and launched a campaign to undermine his reputation, reviving the old claim that he had been an accomplice in the attack on Leon Trotsky in Mexico City in 1940. The campaign became more intense when it became known that Neruda was a candidate for the 1964 Nobel Prize, which was eventually awarded to Jean-Paul Sartre (who rejected it).

In 1966, Neruda was invited to attend an International PEN conference in New York City. Officially, he was barred from entering the U.S. because he was a communist, but the conference organizer, playwright Arthur Miller, eventually prevailed upon the Johnson Administration to grant Neruda a visa. Neruda gave readings to packed halls, and even recorded some poems for the Library of Congress. Miller later opined that Neruda's adherence to his communist ideals of the 1930s was a result of his protracted exclusion from "bourgeois society". Due to the presence of many Eastern Bloc writers, Mexican writer Carlos Fuentes later wrote that the PEN conference marked a "beginning of the end" of the Cold War.

Upon Neruda's return to Chile, he stopped in Peru, where he gave readings to enthusiastic crowds in Lima and Arequipa and was received by President Fernando Belaúnde Terry. However, this visit also prompted an unpleasant backlash; because the Peruvian government had come out against the government of Fidel Castro in Cuba, July 1966 saw more than 100 Cuban intellectuals retaliate against the poet by signing a letter that charged Neruda with colluding with the enemy, calling him an example of the "tepid, pro-Yankee revisionism" then prevalent in Latin America. The affair was particularly painful for Neruda because of his previous outspoken support for the Cuban revolution, and he never visited the island again, even after receiving an invitation in 1968.

After the death of Che Guevara in Bolivia in 1967, Neruda wrote several articles regretting the loss of a "great hero". At the same time, he told his friend Aida Figueroa not to cry for Che, but for Luis Emilio Recabarren, the father of the Chilean communist movement who preached a pacifist revolution over Che's violent ways.

Last years and death

In 1970, Neruda was nominated as a candidate for the Chilean presidency, but ended up giving his support to Salvador Allende, who later won the election and was inaugurated in 1970 as Chile's first democratically elected socialist head of state. Shortly thereafter, Allende appointed Neruda the Chilean ambassador to France, lasting from 1970 to 1972; his final diplomatic posting. During his stint in Paris, Neruda helped to renegotiate the external debt of Chile, billions owed to European and American banks, but within months of his arrival in Paris his health began to deteriorate. Neruda returned to Chile two-and-a-half years later due to his failing health.

In 1971, Neruda was awarded the Nobel Prize, a decision that did not come easily because some of the committee members had not forgotten Neruda's past praise of Stalinist dictatorship. But his Swedish translator, Artur Lundkvist, did his best to ensure the Chilean received the prize. "A poet," Neruda stated in his Stockholm speech of acceptance of the Nobel Prize, "is at the same time a force for solidarity and for solitude." The following year Neruda was awarded the prestigious Golden Wreath Award at the Struga Poetry Evenings.

As the coup d'état of 1973 unfolded, Neruda was diagnosed with prostate cancer. The military coup led by General Augusto Pinochet saw Neruda's hopes for Chile destroyed. Shortly thereafter, during a search of the house and grounds at Isla Negra by Chilean armed forces at which Neruda was reportedly present, the poet famously remarked: "Look around – there's only one thing of danger for you here – poetry."

It was originally reported that, on the evening of 23 September 1973, at Santiago's Santa María Clinic, Neruda had died of heart failure;

However, "(t)hat day, he was alone in the hospital where he had already spent five days. His health was declining and he called his wife, Matilde Urrutia, so she could come immediately because they were giving him something and he wasn’t feeling good." On 12 May 2011, the Mexican magazine Proceso published an interview with his former driver Manuel Araya Osorio in which he states that he was present when Neruda called his wife and warned that he believed Pinochet had ordered a doctor to kill him, and that he had just been given an injection in his stomach. He would die six-and-a-half hours later. Even reports from the pro-Pinochet El Mercurio newspaper the day after Neruda's death refer to an injection given immediately before Neruda's death. According to an official Chilean Interior Ministry report prepared in March 2015 for the court investigation into Neruda's death, "he was either given an injection or something orally" at the Santa María Clinic "which caused his death six-and-a-half hours later. The 1971 Nobel laureate was scheduled to fly to Mexico where he may have been planning to lead a government in exile that would denounce General Augusto Pinochet, who led the coup against Allende on September 11, according to his friends, researchers, and other political observers". The funeral took place amidst a massive police presence, and mourners took advantage of the occasion to protest against the new regime, established just a couple of weeks before. Neruda's house was broken into and his papers and books taken or destroyed.

In 1974, his Memoirs appeared under the title I Confess I Have Lived, updated to the last days of the poet's life, and including a final segment describing the death of Salvador Allende during the storming of the Moneda Palace by General Pinochet and other generals – occurring only 12 days before Neruda died. Matilde Urrutia subsequently compiled and edited for publication the memoirs and possibly his final poem "Right Comrade, It's the Hour of the Garden". These and other activities brought her into conflict with Pinochet's government, which continually sought to curtail Neruda's influence on the Chilean collective consciousness. Urrutia's own memoir, My Life with Pablo Neruda, was published posthumously in 1986. Manuel Araya, his Communist Party-appointed chauffeur, published a book about Neruda's final days in 2012.

Controversy

Rumored murder and exhumation
In June 2013, a Chilean judge ordered that an investigation be launched, following suggestions that Neruda had been killed by the Pinochet regime for his pro-Allende stance and political views. Neruda's driver, Manuel Araya, claimed that he had seen Neruda 2 days prior to his death and that doctors had administered poison as the poet was preparing to go into exile. Araya claimed that he was driving Neruda to buy medicine when he was suddenly stopped by military personnel, who arrested him, hijacked the Fiat 125 he was driving and took him to police headquarters where they tortured Araya. He found out Neruda had died after Santiago Archbishop Raúl Silva Henríquez informed him. In December 2011, Chile's Communist Party asked Chilean Judge Mario Carroza to order the exhumation of the remains of the poet. Carroza had been conducting probes into hundreds of deaths allegedly connected to abuses of Pinochet's regime from 1973 to 1990. Carroza's inquiry during 2011–12 uncovered enough evidence to order the exhumation in April 2013. Eduardo Contreras, a Chilean lawyer who was leading the push for a full investigation, commented: "We have world-class labs from India, Switzerland, Germany, the US, Sweden, they have all offered to do the lab work for free." The Pablo Neruda Foundation fought the exhumation under the grounds that the Araya's claims were unbelievable.

In June 2013, a court order was issued to find the man who allegedly poisoned Neruda. Police were investigating Michael Townley, who was facing trial for the killings of General Carlos Prats (Buenos Aires, 1974), and ex-Chancellor Orlando Letelier (Washington, 1976). The Chilean government suggested that the 2015 test showed it was "highly probable that a third party" was responsible for his death.

Test results were released on 8 November 2013 of the seven-month investigation by a 15-member forensic team. Patricio Bustos, the head of Chile's medical legal service, stated "No relevant chemical substances have been found that could be linked to Mr. Neruda's death" at the time. However, Carroza said that he was waiting for the results of the last scientific tests conducted in May (2015), which found that Neruda was infected with the Staphylococcus aureus bacterium, which can be highly toxic and result in death if modified.

A team of 16 international experts led by Spanish forensic specialist Aurelio Luna from the University of Murcia announced on 20 October 2017 that "from analysis of the data we cannot accept that the poet had been in an imminent situation of death at the moment of entering the hospital" and that death from prostate cancer was not likely at the moment when he died. The team also discovered something in Neruda's remains that could possibly be a laboratory-cultivated bacterium. The results of their continuing analysis were expected in 2018. His cause of death was in fact listed as a heart attack. Scientists who exhumed Neruda's body in 2013 also backed claims that he was also suffering from prostate cancer when he died.

In 2023, a team from McMaster University and the University of Copenhagen confirmed the presence of the Clostridium botulinum bacteria in Neruda's bloodstream, although it is not clear if this contributed to his death.

Feminist protests
In November 2018, the Cultural Committee of Chile's lower house voted in favour of renaming Santiago's main airport after Neruda. The decision sparked protests from feminist groups, who highlighted a passage in Neruda's memoirs describing an incident with a young house maid in 1929 in Ceylon (Sri Lanka). Several feminist groups, bolstered by a growing #MeToo and anti-femicide movement stated that Neruda should not be honoured by his country, describing the passage as evidence of rape. Neruda remains a controversial figure for Chileans, and especially for Chilean feminists.

Legacy

Neruda owned three houses in Chile; today they are all open to the public as museums: La Chascona in Santiago, La Sebastiana in Valparaíso, and Casa de Isla Negra in Isla Negra, where he and Matilde Urrutia are buried.

A bust of Neruda stands on the grounds of the Organization of American States building in Washington, D.C.

In popular culture

Music
 American composer Tobias Picker set to music Tres Sonetos de Amor for baritone and orchestra
 American composer Tobias Picker set to music Cuatro Sonetos de Amor for voice and piano
 American singer/songwriter Taylor Swift referenced Neruda's line "love is so short, forgetting is so long" in the prologue for her 2012 album, Red.
 Greek composer Mikis Theodorakis set to music the Canto general.
 Greek composer and singer Nikos Xilouris composed Οι Νεκρoί της Πλατείας (The dead of the Square) based on Los muertos de la plaza.
 American composer Samuel Barber used Neruda's poems for his cantata The Lovers in 1971.
 Alternative rock musician Lynda Thomas released as a single the flamenco song "Ay, Ay, Ay" (2001), which is based on the book Twenty Love Poems and a Song of Despair.
 Austrian avant-garde composer Michael Gielen set to music Un día sobresale (Ein Tag Tritt Hervor. Pentaphonie für obligates Klavier, fünf Soloinstrumente und fünf Gruppen zu je fünf Musikern mit Worten von Pablo Neruda. 1960–63).
 Native American composer Ron Warren set to music Quatro Sonetos de Amor for coloratura soprano, flute, and piano (1999),  1 from each group of sonnets in Cien Sonetos de Amor. Recorded on Circle All Around Me Blue Heron Music BHM101.
Puerto Rican composer Awilda Villarini used Neruda's text for her composition "Two Love Songs".
 Mexican composer Daniel Catán wrote an opera Il Postino (2010), whose premiere production featured Spanish tenor Plácido Domingo portraying Pablo Neruda.
 The Dutch composer Peter Schat used twelve poems from the Canto General for his cantata Canto General for mezzo-soprano, violin, and piano (1974), which he dedicated to the memory of the late president Salvador Allende.
 The Dutch composer Annette Kruisbrink set to music La Canción Desesperada (2000), the last poem of Veinte poemas de amor y una canción desesperada. Instrumentation: guitar and mixed choir (+ 4 soloists S/A/T/B).
 Folk rock / progressive rock group Los Jaivas, famous in Chile, used Las alturas de Macchu Picchu as the text for their album of the same name.
 Chilean composer Sergio Ortega worked closely with the poet in the musical play Fulgor y muerte de Joaquín Murieta (1967). Three decades later, Ortega expanded the piece into an opera, leaving Neruda's text intact.
Argentine composer Julia Stilman-Lasansky (1935-2007) based her Cantata No. 3 on text by Neruda.
 Peter Lieberson composed Neruda Songs (2005) and Songs of Love and Sorrow (2010) based on Cien Sonetos de Amor.
 Jazz vocalist Luciana Souza released an album called "Neruda" (2004) featuring 10 of Neruda's poems set to the music of Federico Mompou.
 The South African musician Johnny Clegg drew heavily on Neruda in his early work with the band Juluka.
 On the back of Jackson Browne's album The Pretender, there is a poem by Neruda.
 Canadian rock group Red Rider named their 1983 LP/CD release Neruda.
 Chilean composer Leon Schidlowsky has composed a good number of pieces using poems by Neruda. Among them, Carrera, Caupolicán, and Lautaro.
 Pop band Sixpence None the Richer set his poem "Puedo escribir" to music on their platinum-selling self-titled album (1997).
 The group Brazilian Girls turned "Poema 15" ("Poem 15") from Veinte poemas de amor y una canción desesperada (20 love poems and a song of despair) into their song "Me gusta cuando callas" from their self-titled album.
 With permission from the Fundación Neruda, Marco Katz composed a song cycle based on the volume Piedras del cielo for voice and piano. Centaur Records CRC 3232, 2012.
 The Occitan singer Joanda composed the song Pablo Neruda
 American contemporary composer Morten Lauridsen set Neruda's poem "Soneto de la noche" to music as part of his cycle "Nocturnes" from 2005.
 The opening lines for the song "Bachata Rosa" by Juan Luis Guerra was inspired by Neruda's The Book of Questions.
 Ezequiel Vinao composed "Sonetos de amor" (2011) a song cycle based on Neruda's love poems.
 Ute Lemper co-composed the songs of "Forever" (2013) an album of the Love poems of Pablo Neruda
 American composer Daniel Welcher composed Abeja Blanca, for Mezzo-Soprano, English Horn, and Piano using the Abeja Blanca text from Neruda's Twenty Love Songs and a Song of Despair
 Canadian rock band The Tragically Hip, on their album Now for Plan A (Universal, 2012), the sixth track of the album is a song titled "Now For Plan A" which includes a reading by guest vocalist Sarah Harmer of the first two stanzas of the Pablo Neruda poem, "Ode To Age" ("Odă Bătrâneţii").
 Name dropped in the song La Vie Boheme from the 1996 musical Rent written and composed by Jonathan Larson: "To the stage, To Uta, To Buddha, Pablo Neruda too."

Literature
 Neruda's 1952 stay in a villa on the island of Capri was fictionalized in Chilean author Antonio Skarmeta's 1985 novel Ardiente Paciencia (published as Burning Patience, later known as El cartero de Neruda, or Neruda's Postman).
 In 2008, the writer Roberto Ampuero published a novel El caso Neruda, about his private eye Cayetano Brulé where Pablo Neruda is one of the protagonists.
 The Dreamer (2010) is a children's fictional biography of Neruda, "a shy Chilean boy whose spirit develops and thrives despite his father's relentless negativity". Written by Pam Muñoz Ryan and illustrated by Peter Sís, the text and illustrations are printed in Neruda's signature green ink.
 The character of The Poet in Isabel Allende's debut novel The House of the Spirits is likely an allusion to Neruda.
 In the 2007 novel The Reluctant Fundamentalist by Pakistani author Mohsin Hamid, a key time in the political radicalization of the protagonist – a young Pakistani intellectual – is his short stay in Chile, in the course of which he visits the preserved home of Pablo Neruda.
 The newest novel of Isabel Allende, "a long petal of the sea", has numerous important key figures in Chilean history in its narrative. She writes about the life of Pablo Neruda and his involvement in the transportation of numerous fugitives from the Franco regime to Chile.

Theatre
 Name dropped in the song La Vie Boheme from the 1996 award-winning and groundbreaking rock opera RENT written and composed by the late Jonathan Larson "To the stage, To Uta, To Buddha, Pablo Neruda too."

Film
 The Italian film Il Postino, inspired by Antonio Skármeta's 1985 novel Ardiente paciencia (Ardent Patience, later known as El cartero de Neruda or Neruda's Postman), centers on the story of a local postman, a humble soul, living in Salina Island near Sicily during the 1950s, who is puzzled by the amount of mail received by a foreign gentleman who has recently moved in. Pablo Neruda (played by Philippe Noiret), who spent some time in exile there, befriends and inspires in him a love of poetry.
 Neruda is a 120-minute documentary about his life and poetry including interviews with his friends like Volodia Teitelboim, Jose Balmes, Jorge Edwards, Andrej Wosnessenski, and Mikis Theodorakis. This film was directed by the German filmmaker Ebbo Demant and broadcast in 2004 on the European culture TV channel ARTE and the German public-service broadcaster ARD.
 Neruda, a 2016 Chilean film
 The English film Truly, Madly, Deeply, written and directed by Anthony Minghella, uses Neruda's poem "The Dead Woman" as a pivotal device in the plot when Nina (Juliet Stevenson) understands she must let go of her dead lover Jamie (Alan Rickman).
 The 1998 film Patch Adams features Love Sonnet XVII.
 In the 2020 film Chemical Hearts, Grace Town (Lili Reinhart) and Henry Page (Austin Abrams) are shown reading the poems from the Love Sonnet XVII and understanding the depths of it while Henry falls for Grace.
In the film Barbershop (2002), the character Dinka (Leonard Earl Howze) gives flowers to the character Terri (Eve) with a poem by Pablo Neruda.
The Sri Lankan film Alborada, otherwise known as Dawning of the Day, shows Neruda's stay in Ceylon as Chilean Consul in Ceylon.
 Mentioned in the song "La Vie Boheme" in the 2005 film adaption of the award-winning and groundbreaking rock opera RENT originally written by the late Jonathan Larson adapted to screen by Stephen Chbosky and directed by American filmmaker Chris Columbus "To the stage, To Uta, To Buddha, Pablo Neruda too."

Television
 In the U.S. sitcom How I Met Your Mother, both Ted Mosby and the Mother's favourite poem is revealed to be Pablo Neruda's "Mañana XXVII".
 In The Simpsons episode "Bart Sells His Soul", Lisa mentions and quotes Pablo Neruda ("Laughter is the language of the soul") and Bart snidely replies that he is familiar with his work.
 In the Arthur episode "Mr. Ratburn and the Special Someone", Mr. Ratburn is seen reading a fictional collection of Neruda's works entitled Love Poems in the teacher's lounge.
 Mentioned in the Fox special Rent: Live a live television broadcasting of the rock opera RENT during the song "La Vie Boheme": "To the stage, To Uta, To Buddha, Pablo Neruda too." originally written and composed for the stage by the late Jonathan Larson

Science
 For most of his life, Neruda was fascinated by butterflies. In 1976, a sub-group of the South American genus Heliconius was named after him; (see Neruda (genus)) though not currently in use in the primary scientific literature.
 A crater on Mercury is also named Neruda, in his honor.

List of works

Original
 Crepusculario. Santiago, Ediciones Claridad, 1923.
 Veinte poemas de amor y una canción desesperada. Santiago, Editorial Nascimento, 1924.
 Tentativa del hombre infinito. Santiago, Editorial Nascimento, 1926.
 Anillos. Santiago, Editorial Nascimento, 1926. (Prosa poética de Pablo Neruda y Tomás Lago.)
 El hondero entusiasta. Santiago, Empresa Letras, 1933.
 El habitante y su esperanza. Novela. Santiago, Editorial Nascimento, 1926.
 Residencia en la tierra (1925–1931). Madrid, Ediciones del Árbol, 1935.
 España en el corazón. Himno a las glorias del pueblo en la guerra: (1936–1937). Santiago, Ediciones Ercilla, 1937.
 Nuevo canto de amor a Stalingrado. México, 1943.
 Tercera residencia (1935–1945). Buenos Aires, Losada, 1947.
 Alturas de Macchu Picchu. Ediciones de Libreria Neira, Santiago de Chile, 1948.
 Canto general. México, Talleres Gráficos de la Nación, 1950.
 Los versos del capitán. 1952.
 Todo el amor. Santiago, Editorial Nascimento, 1953.
 Las uvas y el viento. Santiago, Editorial Nascimento, 1954.
 Odas elementales. Buenos Aires, Editorial Losada, 1954.
 Nuevas odas elementales. Buenos Aires, Editorial Losada, 1955.
 Tercer libro de las odas. Buenos Aires, Losada, 1957.
 Estravagario. Buenos Aires, Editorial Losada, 1958.
 Navegaciones y regresos. Buenos Aires, Editorial Losada, 1959.
 Oda al Gato, original poem in Navegaciones y regresos book.
 Cien sonetos de amor. Santiago, Editorial Universitaria, 1959.
 Canción de gesta. La Habana, Imprenta Nacional de Cuba, 1960.
 Poesías: Las piedras de Chile. Buenos Aires, Editorial Losada, 1960. Las Piedras de Pablo Neruda
 Cantos ceremoniales. Buenos Aires, Losada, 1961.
 Memorial de Isla Negra. Buenos Aires, Losada, 1964. 5 volúmenes.
 Arte de pájaros. Santiago, Ediciones Sociedad de Amigos del Arte Contemporáneo, 1966.
 Fulgor y muerte de Joaquín Murieta. Santiago, Zig-Zag, 1967. La obra fue escrita con la intención de servir de libreto para una ópera de Sergio Ortega.
 La Barcarola. Buenos Aires, Losada, 1967.
 Las manos del día. Buenos Aires, Losada, 1968.
 Comiendo en Hungría. Editorial Lumen, Barcelona, 1969. (En co-autoría con Miguel Ángel Asturias)
 Fin del mundo. Santiago, Edición de la Sociedad de Arte Contemporáneo, 1969. Con Ilustraciones de Mario Carreño, Nemesio Antúnez, Pedro Millar, María Martner, Julio Escámez y Oswaldo Guayasamín.
 Aún. Editorial Nascimento, Santiago, 1969.
 Maremoto. Santiago, Sociedad de Arte Contemporáneo, 1970. Con Xilografías a color de Carin Oldfelt Hjertonsson.
 La espada encendida. Buenos Aires, Losada, 1970.
 Las piedras del cielo. Editorial Losada, Buenos Aires, 1970.
 Discurso de Estocolmo. Alpignano, Italia, A. Tallone, 1972.
 Geografía infructuosa. Buenos Aires, Editorial Losada, 1972.
 La rosa separada. Éditions du Dragon, París, 1972 con grabados de Enrique Zañartu.
 Incitación al Nixonicidio y alabanza de la revolución chilena. Santiago, Empresa Editora Nacional Quimantú, Santiago, 1973.

English translations
 The Heights of Macchu Picchu (bilingual edition) (Jonathan Cape Ltd London; Farrar, Straus, Giroux New York 1966, translated by Nathaniel Tarn, preface by Robert Pring-Mill)(broadcast by the BBC Third Programme 1966)
 Selected Poems: A Bilingual Edition, translated by Nathaniel Tarn. (Jonathan Cape Ltd London 1970)
 The Captain's Verses (bilingual edition) (New Directions, 1972) (translated by Donald D. Walsh)
 New Poems (1968-1970) (bilingual edition) (Grove Press, 1972) (translated by Ben Belitt)
 Residence on Earth (bilingual edition) (New Directions, 1973) (translated by Donald D. Walsh)
 Extravagaria (bilingual edition) (Farrar, Straus and Giroux, 1974) (translated by Alastair Reid)
 Selected Poems.(translated by Nathaniel Tarn: Penguin Books, London 1975)
 Twenty Love Poems and a Song of Despair (bilingual edition) (Jonathan Cape Ltd London; Penguin Books, 1976 translated by William O'Daly)
 Still Another Day (Copper Canyon Press, 1984, 2005) (translated by William O'Daly)
 The Separate Rose (Copper Canyon Press, 1985) (translated by William O'Daly)
 100 Love Sonnets (bilingual edition) (University of Texas Press, 1986) (translated by Stephen Tapscott)
 Winter Garden (Copper Canyon Press, 1987, 2002) (translated by James Nolan)
 The Sea and the Bells (Copper Canyon Press, 1988, 2002) (translated by William O'Daly)
 The Yellow Heart (Copper Canyon Press, 1990, 2002) (translated by William O'Daly)
 Stones of the Sky (Copper Canyon Press, 1990, 2002) (translated by William O'Daly)
 Selected Odes of Pablo Neruda (University of California Press, 1990) (translated by Margaret Sayers Peden)
 Canto General (University of California Press, 1991) (translated by Jack Schmitt)
 The Book of Questions (Copper Canyon Press, 1991, 2001) (translated by William O'Daly)
 The Poetry of Pablo Neruda, an anthology of 600 of Neruda's poems, some with Spanish originals, drawing on the work of 36 translators. (Farrar, Straus & Giroux Inc, New York, 2003, 2005).
 100 Love Sonnets (bilingual edition) (Exile Editions, 2004, new edition 2016) (translated and with an afterword by Gustavo Escobedo; Introduction by Rosemary Sullivan; Reflections on reading Neruda by George Elliott Clarke, Beatriz Hausner and A. F. Moritz)
 On the Blue Shore of Silence: Poems of the Sea (Rayo HarperCollins, 2004) (translated by Alastair Reid, epilogue Antonio Skármeta)
 The Essential Neruda: Selected Poems (City Lights, 2004) (translated by Robert Hass, Jack Hirschman, Mark Eisner, Forrest Gander, Stephen Mitchell, Stephen Kessler, and John Felstiner. Preface by Lawrence Ferlinghetti)
 Intimacies: Poems of Love (HarperCollins, 2008) (translated by Alastair Reid)
 The Hands of the Day (Copper Canyon Press, 2008) (translated by William O'Daly)
 All The Odes (Farrar, Straus, Giroux, 2013) (various translators, prominently Margaret Sayers Peden)
 Then Come Back: The Lost Neruda (Copper Canyon Press, 2016) (translated by Forrest Gander)
 Venture of the Infinite Man (City Lights, 2017) (translated by Jessica Powell; introduction by Mark Eisner)
 Book of Twilight (Copper Canyon Press, 2018) (translated by William O'Daly)

References

Sources
 Feinstein, Adam (2004). Pablo Neruda: A Passion for Life, Bloomsbury. 
 Neruda, Pablo (1977). Memoirs (translation of Confieso que he vivido: Memorias), translated by Hardie St. Martin, Farrar, Straus, and Giroux, 1977.
 
 Tarn, Nathaniel, Ed (1975). Pablo Neruda: Selected Poems. Penguin.
 Burgin, Richard (1968). Conversations with Jorge Luis Borges, Holt, Rinehart, & Winston
 Consuelo Hernández (2009). "El Antiorientalismo en Pablo Neruda;" Voces y perspectivas en la poesia latinoamericanana del siglo XX. Madrid: Visor 2009.

Further reading
 Pablo Neruda: The Poet's Calling [The Biography of a Poet], by Mark Eisner. New York, Ecco/HarperCollins 2018
 Translating Neruda: The Way to Macchu Picchu John Felstiner 1980
 The poetry of Pablo Neruda. Costa, René de., 1979
 Pablo Neruda: Memoirs (Confieso que he vivido: Memorias) / tr. St. Martin, Hardie, 1977

External links

 Profile at the Poetry Foundation
 Profile at Poets.org with poems and articles
  including the Nobel Lecture, 13 December 1971 Towards the Splendid City
 
 NPR Morning Edition on Neruda's Centennial 12 July 2004 (audio 4 mins)
 "Pablo Neruda's 'Poems of the Sea'" 5 April 2004 (Audio, 8 mins)
 "The ecstasist: Pablo Neruda and his passions". The New Yorker.  8 September 2003
 Documentary-in-progress on Neruda, funded by Latino Public Broadcasting site features interviews from Isabel Allende and others, bilingual poems
 Poems of Pablo Neruda
 "What We Can Learn From Neruda's Poetry of Resistance". The Paris Review. 16 March 2018 by Mark Eisner
 Pablo Neruda recorded at the Library of Congress for the Hispanic Division’s audio literary archive on June 20, 1966

 
1904 births
1973 deaths
People from Linares Province
Chilean atheists
Chilean male poets
Deaths from cancer in Chile
Ambassadors of Chile to France
Chilean diplomats
Chilean Nobel laureates
Communist poets
Deaths from prostate cancer
Nobel laureates in Literature
People of the Spanish Civil War
Stalin Peace Prize recipients
Surrealist poets
Chilean surrealist writers
Communist Party of Chile politicians
Members of the Senate of Chile
National Prize for Literature (Chile) winners
Struga Poetry Evenings Golden Wreath laureates
People from Santiago
Sonneteers
20th-century Chilean poets
20th-century Chilean male writers
Chilean communists
Death conspiracy theories
Chilean expatriates in Argentina
Chilean expatriates in Spain
Chilean expatriates in Mexico
Chilean Marxists
Poet-diplomats
20th-century pseudonymous writers